Pierre Carniti (25 September 1936 – 5 June 2018) was an Italian politician and trade unionist.

Carniti was born in Castelleone, in the province of Cremona, Lombardy. He was general secretary of CISL, the major Catholic trade union federation, between 1979 and 1985. Unlike most other CISL leaders, who were aligned with Christian Democracy, Carniti was a member of the Italian Socialist Party (PSI).

Carniti was president of the Parliamentary Commission on Poverty from 1994 to 1997. He was a Member of the European Parliament from 1989 to 1999, associated with the Party of European Socialists. In 1993, with Ermanno Gorrieri, he left the PSI to co-found the socialist party Social Christians (CS).

See also
 Christian Left

References

External links
Files about his parliamentary activities (in Italian): XI legislature.

1936 births
2018 deaths
Politicians from the Province of Cremona
Italian socialists
Italian Christian socialists
Democratic Party of the Left MEPs
MEPs for Italy 1989–1994
MEPs for Italy 1994–1999
Catholic socialists
People from Castelleone